Arena Monterrey is an indoor arena in Monterrey, Mexico. It is primarily used for shows, concerts and indoor sports like indoor soccer, arena football and basketball. It used to be the home arena of the Monterrey Fury indoor soccer team and the Fuerza Regia, a professional basketball team in the Liga Nacional de Baloncesto Profesional; the Monterrey La Raza, a team in the NISL; and the Monterrey Steel, an indoor American football team in the National Arena League.

The Arena Monterrey is owned by Publimax S.A. de C.V. (TV Azteca Northeast), part of the Avalanz Group, who owns 80% and by TV Azteca who owns 20%. The arena is 45,000 m2 (480,000 square feet) in size.

History
The project of the arena started in 1989 when the Asociación para el Fomento de Deporte y Recreación A.C, led by the businessmen Jorge Lankenau and Hernan Garza presented the project to the then president Carlos Salinas. The project gained support from the Government of the State of Nuevo León who gave the land for the arena to be constructed within the limits of Fundidora Park.

The arena was originally planned to begin construction in May 1992, and finished by 1993, but the construction actually started in January 1994, and was planned to be finished by 1996. However, due to the 1994 economic crisis in Mexico, in May 1995 the project suffered a slowdown in the construction industry and finally came to a complete halt by 1996, due to the lack of economic resources.

In April 2001, the Government of the State of Nuevo León invited 11 groups of investors to discuss the possibilities of restarting the construction of the arena. On June 1, 2001 the government announced that there were only five groups of investors willing to take over the debt and finish up the project and 2 weeks later, Publimax S.A. de C.V. was announced winner of the contest because it was the group with the most money eager to invest in the project (US$50 million).
Before the construction was restarted, Hernán Garza accused the government of illegally revoking the concession that was given to him to build and finish the project. The government revoked the concession because of the halt of the project in 1995, but Garza alleged that the economic crisis obliged him to stop it for some time. This, among other problems such as the government delay in giving full control of the arena and Publimax rejecting any investment until control was fully given (which happened in July 2002), caused the project to restart by the end of 2002 with an estimated finish date by the first trimester of 2004.

However, by the last trimester of 2003, the project was almost completed and the first event in the arena took place on Thursday November 27, 2003, with a concert performed by Mexican singer-songwriter Juan Gabriel.

Events

International summits
Press Center for the Monterrey Special Summit of the Americas – January 2004

Sports events
First WNBA game outside the United States: Detroit Shock vs San Antonio Silver Stars – May 2004
Pre-season NBA Games: Denver Nuggets vs Golden State Warriors – October 2006 and Philadelphia 76ers vs Phoenix Suns – October 2009.
In 2004, World Wrestling Entertainment (WWE) made its debut in Mexico with WWE RAW: Wrestlemania XX Revenge Tour in Monterrey.
The first WWE Raw house show took place on April 3, 2004; after the huge success by the Mexican fans, Raw returned on November of that same year. The SmackDown brand debuted in January 2006 with a sellout.
In October 2008, SmackDown made its return, and ECW its Arena Monterrey debut, with the Survivor Series Live Tour with two dates; October 16 and 17.
Total Nonstop Action Wrestling (TNA) also had a house show in November 2006. In December 2007 TNA was supposed to have another house show in Arena Monterrey, but for some reason it was cancelled.
Lucha Libre AAA World Wide (AAA) held the Héroes Inmortales III event on September 26, 2009, and the Héroes Inmortales pay-per-view on October 9, 2011, at the arena.
8th Shito-Ryu Karate-Do World Championships were held October 17–23, 2015, at the arena.
Monterrey Steel National Arena League football in 2017.

Concerts

Others
Nuestra Belleza Mexico 2008 – September 2008

References

External links

 

2003 establishments in Mexico
American football venues in Mexico
Volleyball venues in Mexico
Basketball venues in Mexico
Indoor soccer venues
Boxing venues in Mexico
Indoor arenas in Mexico
Monterrey La Raza
Sports venues completed in 2003
Sports venues in Monterrey